Walter Alberto López Gasco (born 15 October 1985) is a Uruguayan footballer who plays in defence or midfield.

Club career
Born in Montevideo, López began his career at hometown club Racing Club and spent time in Argentina with San Martín de Tucumán, before moving to Uruguayan Primera División side River Plate Montevideo in 2005. While registered to the club, he spent time on loan in Spain, with Xerez, and in Mexico, with Tecos.

He signed for West Ham United on 5 September 2008. On joining West Ham he was described by caretaker manager Kevin Keen as "a very attacking full-back who can get forward. Like David Di Michele, he is another West Ham-type player who will hopefully show everyone at the club what he can do". Michele had been signed by the club on loan around the same time. López made his debut for West Ham United in a League Cup third round tie, playing the full game in an away defeat at Watford on 23 September 2008. He made his Premier League debut as a late substitute in West Ham's 1–0 win over Manchester City on 1 March 2009.

López failed to cement a place in the first team due to the presence of Congolese international Hérita Ilunga and, having made five substitute Premier League appearances, was subsequently released by West Ham at the end of the 2008–09 season. He returned to Uruguay and signed for Primera División side Cerro. He was then loaned to Brescia of Italy's Serie B. He managed one goal for the Italians, his first outside of South America, in 29 appearances.

In the summer of 2010, López was loaned to Romanian Liga 1 side FC Universitatea Craiova. After a six-month loan, at the start of 2011, the club decided to buy the player and López signed a contract for three years.

In July 2011, López moved back to Uruguay and joined Peñarol. While signed to the club, he spent time on loan at Paraguayan club Cerro Porteño in 2012.

In March 2013, he was arrested and sentenced to 90 days of community service for "crime simulation", after setting fire to his truck and reporting it stolen in order to claim insurance money.

López left Peñarol in September 2013, moving back to Italy to join Serie C club Lecce. After two seasons, he moved once again to Paraguay and joined Sol de América. A further spell in Italy followed, firstly with Campania club Benevento, before moving to Spezia in Liguria in August 2017. On 19 July 2018, he signed a two-year contract with another Serie C club Ternana.

On 31 January 2019, he moved to Serie B club Salernitana.

On 1 February 2021 he signed a 1.5-year contract with Serie C club Triestina.

López also holds a Spanish passport.

International career
López made three appearances for Uruguay in 2006.

Career statistics

Club

Honours
Cerro Porteño
Paraguayan Primera División: 2012 Apertura
Peñarol
Uruguayan Primera División: 2012–13

References

External links

Where Are They Now?: Walter Lopez, Moore Than Just A Club

1985 births
Living people
Footballers from Montevideo
Uruguayan footballers
Association football defenders
Uruguayan Primera División players
Racing Club de Montevideo players
Club Atlético River Plate (Montevideo) players
C.A. Cerro players
Peñarol players
San Martín de Tucumán footballers
Segunda División players
Xerez CD footballers
Liga MX players
Tecos F.C. footballers
Premier League players
West Ham United F.C. players
Paraguayan Primera División players
Cerro Porteño players
Club Sol de América footballers
Serie B players
Serie C players
Brescia Calcio players
U.S. Lecce players
Benevento Calcio players
Spezia Calcio players
Ternana Calcio players
U.S. Salernitana 1919 players
U.S. Triestina Calcio 1918 players
Liga I players
FC U Craiova 1948 players
Uruguayan expatriate footballers
Expatriate footballers in Argentina
Expatriate footballers in Spain
Expatriate footballers in Mexico
Expatriate footballers in England
Expatriate footballers in Paraguay
Expatriate footballers in Italy
Expatriate footballers in Romania
Uruguayan expatriate sportspeople in Argentina
Uruguayan expatriate sportspeople in Spain
Uruguayan expatriate sportspeople in Mexico
Uruguayan expatriate sportspeople in England
Uruguayan expatriate sportspeople in Paraguay
Uruguayan expatriate sportspeople in Italy
Uruguayan expatriate sportspeople in Romania
Uruguay international footballers